The 1962 NFL season was the 43rd regular season of the National Football League (NFL). Before the season, CBS signed a contract with the league to televise all regular-season games for a $4.65 million annual fee.

The season ended on December 30, when the Green Bay Packers defeated the New York Giants 16–7 in the NFL championship game at Yankee Stadium.  The Packers successfully defended their 1961 NFL title, finishing the 1962 season at 14–1; their only loss was to the Detroit Lions on Thanksgiving Day at Tiger Stadium.

Draft
The 1962 NFL Draft was held on December 4, 1961, at Chicago's Sheraton Hotel & Towers. With the first pick, the Washington Redskins selected running back Ernie Davis from Syracuse University.

Major rule changes
Grabbing any player's facemask is prohibited.

Hall of Fame Game

The preseason Hall of Fame Game in Canton, Ohio, debuted this year, following the morning groundbreaking for the Pro Football Hall of Fame on Saturday, August 11. The New York Giants and St. Louis Cardinals played to a 21–21 tie.

Conference races
The Green Bay Packers won their first ten games, until losing 26–14 on November 22 at Detroit. The Lions' win put them a game behind the Pack rather than 2 games behind, but in the final week, they lost to Chicago, 3–0. Even a Lions win would have been made moot when Green Bay's won 20–17 at L.A. to finish with a record of 13–1.

In the Eastern conference, the Redskins were unbeaten after six games. Their four wins and two ties would have been an .833 record in later years, but in 1962, a tie game was not counted at all. In Week Seven (October 28), the Giants handed the Skins their first loss, 49–34. When Washington lost again the next week, 38–10 to Dallas, the Giants 31–28 win over St. Louis gave them a 6–2 record and the conference lead. The Giants rode a nine-game winning streak to capture the Eastern title and the right to host the title game against Green Bay.

Final standings

Postseason

NFL Championship Game

Green Bay 16, New York 7 at Yankee Stadium in New York City on December 30.

Playoff Bowl
The Playoff Bowl was between the conference runners-up, for third place in the league. This was its third year (of ten) and it was played a week after the title game.
Detroit 17, Pittsburgh 10 at Orange Bowl in Miami, Florida, on January 6, 1963.

Awards

Coaching changes

Offseason
St. Louis Cardinals: Wally Lemm became the team's new head coach. Pop Ivy resigned after the twelfth game (5–7) in 1961. assistants Chuck Drulis, Ray Prochaska, and Ray Willsey served as co-head coaches for the final two games of that season, both wins.

In-season
Los Angeles Rams: Bob Waterfield resigned after eight games (1–7), succeeded by defensive line coach Harland Svare (0–5–1).

See also
1962 American Football League season

References

NFL Record and Fact Book
NFL History 1961–1970 (Last accessed December 4, 2005)
Total Football: The Official Encyclopedia of the National Football League

1962